Sergiu Suciu (born 8 May 1990) is a Romanian professional footballer who plays as a midfielder for Italian  club Trento.

Club career
Sergiu moved to Italy with his parents at the age of 13 and soon became affiliated with Torino under club president Franco Cimminelli in 2003. However, due to lack of Italian residency he was unable to play in any official matches for some time. After several years with the youth team, he stood out as one of the best players at the prestigious Torneo di Viareggio in 2009, scoring a brace against Bologna.

After making the bench several times for the senior side, he made his Serie A debut for Torino on 31 May 2009 in a game against A.S. Roma when he came on as a last-minute substitute for Tommaso Vailatti. Torino were relegated at the end of the season and Sergiu was loaned to third division team Legnano, headed by former Torino youth coach Beppe Scienza. He was recalled by Torino on 1 February 2011 to play in the Torneo di Viareggio, but his season was abruptly ended after rupturing the ACL in his left knee.

On 3 January 2011, he signed a new —year contract, but was loaned again to Gubbio in Prima Divisione. After attaining his Italian passport in the Summer of 2011, he became part of the Torino first team under Giampiero Ventura. He made his debut in Serie B on 24 September 2011 as a substitute during Torino-Nocerina. On 30 September 2011, he scored his first goal of the season in a 1–2 victory away to Sampdoria, but also injuring himself for 45 days.

On 26 May 2012 he was injured once again during Albinoleffe-Torino, tearing a ligament after a clash with an opponent.

On 31 January 2013 he was loaned to Juve Stabia in Serie B. He debuted as a starter on 2 February in the away fixture against Vicenza, remaining on the pitch for the full 90 minutes and showed a great performance for the decisive victory of 2–1 for The Wasps. He scored his first goal on 19 May in an away game to Crotone (the momentary 1–3). He returned to Turin at the end of the season but on 8 July, he was again loaned to the club from Campania. The following year he was loaned to Crotone.

On 5 August 2015 he moved to Lecce in Lega Pro with an obligation to purchase his contract in case of promotion to Serie B.

In the summer of 2016 he moved to Pordenone.

On 15 February 2021 he returned to Juve Stabia, now in Serie C.

On 10 August 2022, Suciu signed with Serie C club Torres. On 4 January 2023, he moved to Trento on a 1.5-year contract.

Honours
AS Gubbio
Lega Pro Prima Divisione: 2010–11

References

External links
 Profile at aic.football.it
 

1990 births
Living people
Sportspeople from Satu Mare
Romanian emigrants to Italy
Romanian footballers
Association football midfielders
Serie A players
Serie B players
Serie C players
Torino F.C. players
A.C. Legnano players
A.S. Gubbio 1910 players
S.S. Juve Stabia players
F.C. Crotone players
U.S. Lecce players
U.S. Cremonese players
Pordenone Calcio players
Venezia F.C. players
U.S. Pistoiese 1921 players
Liga I players
AFC Chindia Târgoviște players
S.E.F. Torres 1903 players
A.C. Trento 1921 players
Romanian expatriate footballers
Romanian expatriate sportspeople in Italy
Expatriate footballers in Italy
Romania youth international footballers
Romania under-21 international footballers